Daniel Frederick Grant (February 21, 1946 – October 14, 2019) was a Canadian professional ice hockey left winger, who played in the National Hockey League (NHL) for parts of fourteen seasons from 1966 to 1979, most notably for the Minnesota North Stars. In his career, Grant notched 263 goals and 535 points while playing for the Montreal Canadiens, Minnesota North Stars, Detroit Red Wings and the Los Angeles Kings, and played in three All-Star Games (1969, 1970, 1971). He married Linda Simpson in 1968.

Playing career
Grant was born in Fredericton, New Brunswick. After a fine junior career with the Peterborough Petes and a season and a half in the minor leagues with the Houston Apollos, Grant made the NHL with the Montreal Canadiens in 1967–68, playing 22 regular season games and 10 playoff games.  Grant helped Montreal win the Stanley Cup in 1968.

He was then acquired by the Minnesota North Stars, and in his 1968–69 rookie season with the club won the NHL's Calder Memorial Trophy as the league's most outstanding rookie player, thus becoming one of only four players who won the Stanley Cup the season before winning the Calder Trophy. He would remain a star for Minnesota for six seasons, scoring 32 or more goals in three of them.

Despite this, Grant was traded during the 1974–75 season in a surprising deal for defensive forward Henry Boucha (whose attraction to the franchise may have been that he was a Minnesota native), and the trade backfired badly; Grant had his best season that season, scoring 50 goals for the Detroit Red Wings while on a line with superstar centre Marcel Dionne, and becoming only the 12th player in NHL history to accomplish that feat. However, Grant was plagued by injuries from that point on, and only played partial seasons at best thereafter. He retired after the 1978–79 season to coach a Tier II junior team.

In 1985, he was inducted into the New Brunswick Sports Hall of Fame.

Post-playing career
Grant went on to coach the University of New Brunswick hockey team in 1995 and 1996, and the Halifax Mooseheads Quebec league junior team in 1998. Grant was an assistant coach for the St. Thomas Tommies men's hockey team since the 2002–03 season.

Grant sat on the TELUS Atlantic Canada Community Board, which allocates funding to organizations which involve youth and/or technology throughout Atlantic Canada.

Grant died of cancer on October 14, 2019 at the age of 73.

Awards and achievements
Selected to the OHA-Jr. Second All-Star Team in 1964–65.
Selected to the OHA-Jr. First All-Star Team in 1965–66.
Stanley Cup champion in 1968.
Calder Memorial Trophy winner in 1968–69.
Played in 1969, 1970 and 1971 NHL All-Star Games.
Inducted into the New Brunswick Sports Hall of Fame in 1985.

Career statistics

Regular season and playoffs

Notes
Note: Harper served as Red Wings captain for most of the 1975–76 season, while Grant was injured and out of the lineup.
Note: Polonich served as Red Wings captain for part of the 1976–77 season, while Grant was injured and out of the lineup.

References

External links
 
 Grant's NHL Alumni page

1946 births
2019 deaths
Calder Trophy winners
Canadian ice hockey coaches
Canadian ice hockey right wingers
Detroit Red Wings captains
Detroit Red Wings players
Fredericton Express players
Halifax Mooseheads coaches
Houston Apollos players
Ice hockey people from New Brunswick
Los Angeles Kings players
Minnesota North Stars players
Montreal Canadiens players
New Brunswick Sports Hall of Fame inductees
Peterborough Petes (ice hockey) players
Quebec Aces (AHL) players
Sportspeople from Fredericton
Stanley Cup champions